The 1929 Nobel Prize in Literature was awarded to the German author Thomas Mann (1875–1955) "principally for his great novel, Buddenbrooks, which has won steadily increased recognition as one of the classic works of contemporary literature." He is the fourth German author to be awarded the literature prize after Paul von Heyse in 1910.

Laureate

Thomas Mann was a prolific writer of fiction and novels who wrote in a variety of genres. He was a merchant's son and was supposed to inherit the family's grain business in Lübeck, but like his older brother Heinrich, he decided to focus on literature. In 1905, he married Katia Pringsheim, and the couple had six children, four of whom also became significant authors (Erika, Klaus, and Golo). His highly symbolic and ironic epic novels and novellas are noted for their insight into the psychology of the artist and the intellectual. His analysis and critique of the European and German soul used modernized versions of German and Biblical stories, as well as the ideas of Goethe, Nietzsche, and Schopenhauer. His best known oeuvres include Der Tod in Venedig ("Death in Venice", 1912), Der Zauberberg ("The Magic Mountain", 1924), Joseph und seine Brüder ("Joseph and His Brothers", 1933–1943), and Doktor Faustus ("Dr. Faustus", 1947).

Buddenbrooks
Mann won the Nobel Prize primarily because of his breakthrough 1901 novel Buddenbrooks, which chronicles the decline of a wealthy north German merchant family over the course of four generations, incidentally portraying the manner of life and mores of the Hanseatic bourgeoisie in the years from 1835 to 1877. The novel was subtitled "a family's decline  [verfall einer Familie]" in its original language. Although the Nobel award generally recognizes an author's body of work, the Swedish Academy identified it as the principal reason for his prize. The rationale could also be seen as a reference to one of Mann's later works, The Magic Mountain, a coming-of-age story and, together with Buddenbrooks, his most well-known composition.

Nominations
Thomas Mann was only nominated thrice before he was finally awarded in 1929. He was first nominated in 1924 by the 1912 Nobel Prize laureate Gerhart Hauptmann. His 1929 nomination came from the Nobel Committee member Anders Österling (1884–1981). In 1948, Mann was unconventionally nominated again by two Swedish Academy members (H. Gullberg and E. Löfstedt), but his nomination was not considered during the deliberation process due to the reason that he was already a Nobel laureate.

The Swedish Academy received 30 nominations for 24 authors among them Erik Axel Karlfeldt, Kostis Palamas, Johan Bojer, Édouard Estaunié, and Arno Holz. Six of the nominees were first-time nominated namely Stefan George, Edwin Arlington Robinson, Thorton Wilder, Cale Young Rice, Benedetto Croce, and Knud Rasmussen. The Spanish writer Concha Espina de la Serna  was the only female nominee.

The authors Olav Aukrust, Katharine Lee Bates, Barbara Baynton, Maurice Bouchor, Bliss Carman, Edward Carpenter, Lucy Clifford, Georges Courteline, Anna Bowman Dodd, Ellen Thorneycroft Fowler, Albert Giraud, Shtjefën Gjeçovi, Alice Stopford Green, Max Lehmann, Liang Qichao, Mary Elizabeth Mann, John Morris-Jones, Jānis Pliekšāns (known as Rainis), Hans Prutz, Grace Rhys, Dallas Lore Sharp, Flora Annie Steel,  Vedam Venkataraya Sastry died in 1929 without having been nominated for the prize.

Prize decision
In 1924, when Thomas Mann was first nominated for the prize, the Nobel committee were divided. His candidacy was supported by committee chairman Per Hallström and Anders Österling, while other members had doubts to award Mann. It was decided to await his next work for further deliberations. Following the publication of the novel The Magic Mountain, Mann was nominated again by Österling in 1928, but the Nobel committee concluded that the novel (later widely regarded as Mann's masterpiece) was not as strong as his earlier works. Per Hallström in particular pushed for a prize to Mann, and the following year the committe agreed on that Thomas Mann should be awarded the prize, primarily for the novel Buddenbrooks. The Swedish Academy followed the recommendation and voted for a prize to Mann.

Notes

References

External links
The Nobel Prize Award Ceremony 1929 nobelprize.org

Thomas Mann
1929